Asahan is a state constituency in Malacca, Malaysia, that has been represented in the Malacca State Legislative Assembly.

The state constituency was first contested in 2003 and is mandated to return a single Assemblyman to the Malacca State Legislative Assembly under the first-past-the-post voting system.

Definition 
The Asahan constituency contains the polling districts of Simpang Tebong, Pekan Selandar, Bukit Sedanan, Batang Melaka, Jus, Bukit Senggeh, Pekan Nyalas, FELDA Bukit Senggeh, Pondok Batang, Ladang Bukit Asahan and Pekan Asahan.

Demographics

History
According to the gazette issued on 31 October 2022, the Asahan constituency has a total of 11 polling districts.

Representation history

Election results
The electoral results for the Asahan state constituency in 2004, 2008, 2013 and 2018 are as follows.

References

Malacca state constituencies